Hardy is the given name of:

 Hardy Amies (1909–2003), English fashion designer
 Hardy Åström (born 1951), Swedish hockey player
 Hardy Binguila (born 1996), Congolese footballer
 Hardy Brown (1924–1991), American football player
 Hardy Campbell, Jr. (c. 1863–1898), American horse trainer and owner
 Hardy Cross (1885–1959), American structural engineer
 Hardy Cross Dillard (1902–1982), American jurist, judge on the International Court of Justice
 Hardy N. Ganong (1890–1963), Canadian sportsman and major general
 Hardy Haberman (born 1950), American author, filmmaker, educator, designer and figure in the leather/fetish/BDSM community
 Hardy Ivy (1779–1842), said to be the first person of European descent to permanently settle in Atlanta, Georgia, United States
 Hardy Jones (1943-2018), American wildlife and conservation documentary filmmaker
 Hardy Krüger, (1928–2022), German actor born Franz Eberhard August Krüger
 Hardy Künzli, Swiss slalom canoeist who competed in the 1970s
 Hardy Limeback, Canadian associate professor of dentistry
 Hardy Lucas, member of the National Assembly of Seychelles
 Hardy McLain (born 1952), American hedge fund manager
 Hardy Murfree (1752–1809), American lieutenant colonel in the American Revolutionary War
 Hardy Myers (1939-2016), American lawyer and politician
 Hardy Nickerson (born 1965), American football player
 Hardy Nilsson (born 1947), Swedish ice hockey player and coach
 Hardy Pace (1785–1864), American ferryman, miller and early settler of Atlanta, Georgia
 Hardy Falconer Parsons (1897–1917), English First World War officer, recipient of the Victoria Cross
 Hardy Rafn (1930–1997), Danish actor
 Hardy Rawls (born 1952), American actor
 Hardy Richardson (1855–1931), American baseball player nicknamed "Hardy"
 Hardy Strickland (1818–1884), Confederate politician and soldier
 Hardy Ward (c.1950-2018), American world champion archer
 Hardy Williams (1931–2010), American politician